Westhoffen is a commune in the Bas-Rhin department and Grand Est region of north-eastern France.

History 
From 1236 Westhofen was a fief of the Holy Roman Empire to the Lords of Lichtenberg, who with their successors Hanau-Lichtenberg will remain the lords of the places until the French Revolution. In the rule of Lichtenberg it was assigned to Amt Westhofen of the same name. In 1332 Westhofen received Town privileges, namely that of Haguenau.

The coat of arms of Westhoffen is thus directly inspired by the seal of the Lichtenbergs: a helm with a swan's neck crest. At this time (1250) the construction of the Saint-Martin church began, one of the rare hall churches of the Gothic period, which was profoundly altered and enlarged in the 19th century, thus giving it a neo-Gothic external appearance then in vogue.

When Jakobus ("James"), Count of Lichtenberg, the last male member of the family, died in 1480, the inheritance was divided between his two nieces, Anna and Elisabeth. Anna had married Philipp I, Count of Hanau-Lichtenberg (1417–1480), through whom Amt Westhofen came to the County of Hanau-Lichtenberg that resulted from this marriage.

Population

Gallery

See also
 Communes of the Bas-Rhin department

References

Bas-Rhin communes articles needing translation from French Wikipedia
Communes of Bas-Rhin